Chevremont is a railway station in Kerkrade, the Netherlands. The station opened on 15 May 1949 on the Schaesberg–Simpelveld railway, which is part of the Heuvellandlijn (Maastricht–Kerkrade). Train services are operated by Arriva.

Train services
The following local train services call at this station:
Stoptrein: Sittard–Heerlen–Kerkrade

Platform
There is one platform where trains in both directions depart.

External links
NS website 
Dutch public transport travel planner 

Railway stations in Kerkrade
Railway stations opened in 1949
Railway stations on the Heuvellandlijn